Elections to Weymouth and Portland Borough Council were held on 2 May 2002.  One third of the council was up for election and the council stayed under no overall control.

After the election, the composition of the council was
Labour 14
Liberal Democrat 11
Conservative 6
Independent 4

Election result

Ward results

References
2002 Weymouth and Portland election result
Few shocks as borough maintains its stalemate
Ward results 

2002
2002 English local elections
2000s in Dorset